Bayantsagaan (Mongolian:Баянцагаан, rich white) is the name of several sums (districts) in Mongolia:

 Bayantsagaan, Bayankhongor
 Bayantsagaan, Töv

See also 
 Bayan (disambiguation)
 Tsagaan (disambiguation)